Rafael Razimovich Kadyrov (April 4, 1969 – January 19, 2017) was a Russian ice hockey referee.

Chief Justice of the Russian Higher Hockey League from season 1998/99. September 8, 2016, Kadyrov played his 700th match in the championships of Russia, becoming the second hockey referee, who have achieved this result.  In matches KHL worked since the league base.

Rafael Kadyrov served Kontinental Hockey League All-Star Game in 2016, two adult world championships, six youth and junior world championships.

In October 2016 Kadyrov was diagnosed —  a brain tumor —  astrocytoma of the third degree. He died in January 2017 .

References

External links
KHL Profile
  Sportbox Profile
 Кадыров и Кулёв держат марку

1969 births
2017 deaths
Sportspeople from Ufa
Russian ice hockey officials
Deaths from brain tumor
Deaths from cancer in Russia